Frizzled-4 (Fz-4) is a protein that in humans is encoded by the FZD4 gene. Fz-4 has also been designated as CD344 (cluster of differentiation 344).

Function 

This gene is a member of the frizzled gene family. Members of this family encode seven-transmembrane domain proteins that are receptors for the Wingless type MMTV integration site family of signaling proteins. Frizzled-4 is the only representative of frizzled family members that binds strongly an additional ligand Norrin that is functionally similar but structurally different from Wingless type proteins. FZD4 signaling induced by Norrin regulates vascular development of vertebrate retina and controls important blood vessels in the ear. Most frizzled receptors are coupled to the beta-catenin canonical signaling pathway. This protein may play a role as a positive regulator of the Wingless type MMTV integration site signaling pathway. A transcript variant retaining intronic sequence and encoding a shorter isoform has been described, however, its expression is not supported by other experimental evidence.

See also 
 Frizzled

References

Further reading

External links 
 ]
 GeneReviews/NCBI/NIH/UW entry on Familial Exudative Vitreoretinopathy, Autosomal Dominant

Clusters of differentiation
G protein-coupled receptors